Agata Karczmarzewska-Pura (born ) is a Polish female volleyball player. She was part of the Poland women's national volleyball team.

She played at the 2001 Women's European Volleyball Championship, 2004 FIVB World Grand Prix, 2008 FIVB World Grand Prix, and PTPS Nafta-Gaz Piła.

References

External links
 Profile at FIVB.org
http://www.todor66.com/volleyball/Europe/Women_2001.html
 http://wisla-warszawa.pl/agata-karczmarzewska-pura/
 http://www.cev.lu/Competition-Area/PlayerDetails.aspx?TeamID=6334&PlayerID=4456&ID=171

1978 births
Living people
Polish women's volleyball players
Place of birth missing (living people)